Robert Alt (2 January 1927 – 4 December 2017) was a Swiss bobsledder who competed in the mid-1950s. He won a gold medal in the four-man event at the 1956 Winter Olympics in Cortina d'Ampezzo. Alt also won a gold medal in the four-man event at the 1955 FIBT World Championships in St. Moritz.

References

1927 births
2017 deaths
Olympic bobsledders of Switzerland
Bobsledders at the 1956 Winter Olympics
Olympic gold medalists for Switzerland
Swiss male bobsledders
Olympic medalists in bobsleigh
Medalists at the 1956 Winter Olympics
20th-century Swiss people